This article lists the confirmed squads lists for badminton's 2015 Sudirman Cup

Group 1A

China

Thailand

Germany

Group 1B

Japan

Chinese Taipei

Russia

Group 1C

Denmark

Indonesia

England

Group 1D

Korea

India

Malaysia

References

2015
Sudirman Cup
Sudirman Cup
2015 Sudirman Cup
International sports competitions hosted by China